Garry Spencer Puetz (born March 14, 1952) is a former American football guard and tackle in the National Football League (NFL) for the New York Jets, Tampa Bay Buccaneers, Philadelphia Eagles, New England Patriots, and the Washington Redskins.  He played college football at Valparaiso University and was drafted in the twelfth round of the 1973 NFL Draft.

In 1971 and 1972, he was named to the Kodak College Division All-American Team. A three-time All-ICC offensive tackle (also kicker in 1972), he owns the distinction of earning a Super Bowl ring in 1982 with the Washington Redskins.

Puetz played baseball in college for two seasons, hitting .321 each year and leading the Crusaders in hitting in 1972 .

Puetz is retired after spending 14 years as Director of Transportation for the Forsyth County (Ga.) School System and 23 years in the Pupil Transportation field.

1952 births
Living people
People from Forsyth County, Georgia
Sportspeople from the Atlanta metropolitan area
People from Elmhurst, Illinois
Sportspeople from Cook County, Illinois
Players of American football from Georgia (U.S. state)
Players of American football from Illinois
American football offensive guards
Valparaiso Beacons football players
New York Jets players
Tampa Bay Buccaneers players
Philadelphia Eagles players
New England Patriots players
Washington Redskins players